Ian Murray Revell (born 7 February 1948) is a former New Zealand politician. He was an MP from 1990 to 1999, representing the National Party. Before entering politics, Revell was a senior detective in the New Zealand Police.

Member of Parliament 

He was first elected to Parliament in the 1990 election as MP for Birkenhead, defeating the incumbent Jenny Kirk of the Labour Party. He remained MP for Birkenhead until the seat was abolished in the 1996 election, when he successfully stood for the new Northcote electorate. In the 1999 election, he was defeated by Labour's Ann Hartley by less than 300 votes. As he was not on National's party list, he left Parliament.

After politics 
He now works as a Senior Sales Consultant for Prestige Realty and has been the recipient of the Top Salesperson Award for 2006 and 2007. Revell primarily works on Auckland's North Shore, based in Takapuna.

Revell was formerly the patron of the Monarchist League of New Zealand, but resigned in favour of Sir Peter Tapsell in 2000 soon after leaving Parliament.

At the 2016 Auckland elections, Revell stood for the Takapuna-Devonport local board, as part of Team George Wood. He finished eighth, and was not elected to the board.

References 

New Zealand National Party MPs
1948 births
Living people
New Zealand MPs for Auckland electorates
Members of the New Zealand House of Representatives
New Zealand police officers
New Zealand monarchists
People from Lower Hutt
21st-century New Zealand politicians